Michael Jung (born 31 July 1982) is a German equestrian who competes in eventing and show jumping. A three-time Olympic gold medallist, he won individual and team gold at the 2012 London Olympics, followed by individual gold and team silver at the 2016 Rio Olympics. He was inducted into the Eventing Rider Association Hall of Fame in 2013, and in 2016 he became only the second rider in history to win the Grand Slam of Eventing.

Career
He was born to Joachim Jung, a former dressage and show jumping competitor and took up horse riding aged 6. He won individual bronze at the 2009 European Championships. At the 2012 Olympic Games, he won gold medals in the individual and team events. In winning the individual event (on his 30th birthday), he made eventing history by becoming the first rider to ever hold the Olympic, World and European championship titles at the same time, having previously won the 2010 World title and 2011 European title. He won all three titles on the horse La Biosthetique Sam.

Since then, Jung has won individual and team gold medals at the 2013 Europeans, individual silver and team gold at the 2014 World Equestrian Games and individual and team gold at the 2015 European Championships. His individual victory at the 2015 Europeans made him only the second rider in history, after Virginia Leng, to win three consecutive European individual titles on three different horses. His wins were on La Biosthetique Sam (2011), Halunke FBW (2013) and FischerTakinou (2015). He won individual and team silver at the 2017 European Championships on Fischerrocanna. Michael Jung's individual silver at the 2014 World Equestrian Games & his individual silver at the 2017 Europeans were won on Fischerocona FST.

Jung's win at Badminton in 2016 sealed the Rolex Grand Slam, becoming only the second person in history to win it. His top horse La Biothesque Sam has also finished second at the Badminton horse trials in 2013 and 2017, and third at both Rolex Kentucky (2015) and Luhmuhlen (2015).

CCI 5* results

International Championship results

Notable horses
 Marco 522 - 1995 Bay Holsteiner Gelding (Mytens XX x Montanus)
 2003 European Young Rider Championships - team silver medal, individual gold medal
 La Biosthetique Sam FBW - 2000 Bay Baden-Wurttemberger Gelding (Stan The Man XX x Heraldik XX)
 2007 FEI Eventing Young Horse World Championships - second place
 2008 FEI Eventing World Cup Final - fourth place
 2009 FEI Eventing World Cup Final - gold medal
 2009 Luhmühlen CCI**** winner
 2009 European Championships - individual bronze medal
 2010 World Equestrian Games - team fifth place, individual gold medal
 2011 European Championships - team gold medal, individual gold medal
 2012 London Olympic Games - team gold medal, individual gold medal
 2015 Burghley CCI**** winner
 2016 Badminton CCI**** winner
 2016 Rio Olympic Games - team silver medal, individual gold medal
 Desperado S - 2001 Bay Wurttemberger Gelding (Divino de L x Grand Ferdinand II)
 2007 FEI Eventing Young Horse World Championships - 13th place
 River of Joy 4 - 2001 Dark Bay Wurttemberger Gelding (Rubicell x Pageno xx)
 2008 FEI Eventing Young Horse World Championships - seventh place
 Leopin FST - 1999 Bay German Riding Horse Gelding (Legal Legend XX x Pius)
 2012 Luhmühlen CCI**** winner
 FischerRocana FST - 2005 Dark Bay German Sport Horse Mare (Ituango XX x Carismo)
 2014 World Equestrian Games - team gold medal, individual silver medal
 2015 Kentucky CCI**** winner
 2016 Kentucky CCI**** winner
 2017 Kentucky CCI**** winner
 2017 European Championships - individual silver medal
 FischerTakinou - 2007 Red Roan Anglo Arabian Gelding (Jaguar Mail x Sardana Pierre)
 2015 European Championships - team gold medal, individual gold medal
 FischerChipmunk FRH - 2008 Bay Hanoverian Gelding (Contendro I x Heraldik XX)
2019 European Championships - team gold medal, individual silver medal
2022 Kentucky CCI5* winner

References

German event riders
1982 births
Living people
Olympic equestrians of Germany
German male equestrians
Equestrians at the 2012 Summer Olympics
Equestrians at the 2016 Summer Olympics
Olympic gold medalists for Germany
Olympic medalists in equestrian
Medalists at the 2012 Summer Olympics
Medalists at the 2016 Summer Olympics
Olympic silver medalists for Germany
Equestrians at the 2020 Summer Olympics
People from Main-Taunus-Kreis
Sportspeople from Darmstadt (region)